A fort is a fortification: a defensive military construction.

Fort may also refer to:

Types of fortifications
Castle, a fortified building
Defensive wall, a fortified wall
Blanket fort or pillow fort, built by children
Device Forts, in England and Wales from 1539
Hillfort, earthworks used as a fortified refuge
Martello tower, in the British Empire 19th century
Promontory fort, mainly Iron Age
Star fort, in 15th and 16th century Europe
Tegart fort, in Palestine from 1930s
Wagon fort, a mobile fortification

Arts, entertainment and media
Fort (band), an Australian band
The Fort (novel), a 2010 novel by Bernard Cornwell
Forts (video game), a 2017 video game by EarthWork Games
Forts, a 2007 album by The Boggs
FORT, the peer-reviewed journal of the Fortress Study Group
The Fort, a 2022 novel by Gordon Korman.

People
Fort (surname), includes a list of people with that name
Michael McKenry (born 1985), nicknamed "The Fort", an American baseball player

Places
 Fort Road (disambiguation)
 Fort Street (disambiguation)
 Fort Avenue (disambiguation)

India
Fort (Mumbai precinct)

Sri Lanka
Fort (Colombo)

Philippines
Bonifacio Global City, also known as 'The Fort'

United Kingdom
Glasgow Fort, Scotland; a shopping centre

United States
A name prefix used for many United States Army installations 
The Fort (Taft, California), a historic building
The Fort (Morrison, Colorado), a historic restaurant
The Fort (North Lewisburg, Ohio), a historic house
The Fort, a nickname for Gillette Stadium by New England Revolution soccer fans

Other meanings
Fleet Fort, a Canadian World War II aircraft
RPC Fort, a Ukrainian arms manufacturer
Fort 12, a Ukrainian semi-automatic pistol

See also

Fortes, a name
  for Wikipedia articles on forts

Fort-class replenishment ship (disambiguation)
Fort ship (disambiguation)
Fortress (disambiguation)
Forth (disambiguation)
Forte (disambiguation)
Castle (disambiguation)